The following are the national records in athletics in China maintained by Chinese Athletics Association (CAA).

Outdoor

Key to tables:

+ = en route to a longer distance

h = hand timing

OT = oversized track (> 200m in circumference)

NWI = no wind information

! = timing by photo-electric cell

X = unratified due to doping violation

Men

Women

Mixed

Indoor

Men

Women

Notes

References
General
 Chinese Outdoor Records 31 December 2019 updated
 Chinese Indoor Records 20 February 2019 updated
Specific

External links
CAA web site 

China
Records
Athletics
Athletics